Ookteechenskaia (also referred to as Ookteechenskaia-on-Shilka) was a remote village located in the Transbaikal region of Russia in Siberia.

It is unclear if the village still exists, has been incorporated into another geographic moniker, or if it has been abandoned.

References

Populated places in Siberia